After the Act is a 1965 British thriller novel by the British writer Winston Graham.

References

Bibliography
Murphy, Bruce F. The Encyclopedia of Murder and Mystery. Springer, 1999.

1965 British novels
Novels by Winston Graham
British thriller novels
Hodder & Stoughton books